Cupidesthes cuprifascia is a butterfly in the family Lycaenidae. It is found in the Republic of the Congo and Tshopo in the Democratic Republic of the Congo.

References

Butterflies described in 1921
Lycaenesthini